The Grain Valley R-V School District is a school district in Grain Valley, Missouri, as well as parts of Blue Springs, Oak Grove, and unincorporated eastern Jackson County, in the U.S. state of Missouri. The district has an enrollment of over 4000 students, up from 1659 students in 2000

Elementary schools
 Matthews Elementary School
 Prairie Branch Elementary School
 Sni-A-Bar Elementary School
 Stony Point Elementary School

Middle schools
 Grain Valley South Middle School
 Grain Valley North Middle School

High schools
 Grain Valley High School

Other
The district also has an Early Childhood Special Education Center for 3 to 5 year-olds who qualify for special education services.

References

School districts in Missouri
Education in Jackson County, Missouri